The Sixth Man is a crime fiction novel by American writer David Baldacci. The book was initially published on April 19, 2011 by Grand Central Publishing. This is the fifth installment in the King and Maxwell book series.

Plot summary

Sean King and Michelle Maxwell are called to help Edgar Roy, an alleged serial killer awaiting trial. Roy faces almost certain conviction. Roy’s attorney, Sean’s friend and mentor Ted Bergin, is set to meet with King and Maxwell to help work the case. But their investigation is derailed when Sean and Michelle find Bergin murdered on a quiet highway in New England. King and Maxwell uncover a secret government program which uses analysts to examine the combined intelligence government channels and offer strategic advice. Roy was the top such analyst. King and Maxwell are aided by Roy's half sister, a former spy. The trio uncover a conspiracy by the Secretary of Homeland Security to shut down the program and have Roy executed. The novel ends with Michelle waking from a coma after the final battle and Sean realizing how much their relationship meant to him.

Characters
 Michelle Maxwell: An ex-Secret Service agent, featured first in Split Second and again in Hour Game and Simple Genius. She is the partner of Sean King. Dark hair, attractive, five feet ten inches tall (about 1.75m), an Olympic medalist in rowing and an expert in combat.
 Sean King: Also an ex-Secret Service agent, Sean King is in his forties, six feet two (about 1.88m), and handsome. King and Maxwell's relationship is portrayed as mostly platonic.

References

External links
Official website

2011 American novels
Novels by David Baldacci
Grand Central Publishing books